Delcam is a supplier of advanced CAD/CAM software for the manufacturing industry.

The company has grown steadily since being founded formally in 1977, after initial development work at Cambridge University, UK.

It is now a global developer of product design and manufacturing software, with subsidiaries and joint ventures in North America, South America, Europe and Asia with a total staff of over 800 people and local support provided from over 300 re-seller offices worldwide.  It was listed on the London Stock Exchange until 6 February 2014, when it was acquired by Autodesk.

It now operates as a wholly owned, independently operated subsidiary of Autodesk.

History

Overview

In 1965, Donald Welbourn

saw the possibility of using computers to help pattern makers solve the problems of modelling difficult 3D shapes. He persuaded the Science Research Council to support research at the Cambridge University Engineering Department. Early sponsorship was provided by Ford and Control Data in Germany, whose customers included Volkswagen and Daimler-Benz. In 1974 the Delta Group seconded Ed Lambourne (later the Technical Director at Delcam) to the Cambridge Team. After Lambourne returned to Delta, a Birmingham-based development centre was established in 1977.

In 1989, the company was bought from Delta Group in a buyout led by Managing Director Hugh Humphreys and Ed Lambourne. The company was renamed Delcam International in 1991 and moved to a new purpose-built office in Small Heath. In July 1997, Delcam Ltd was floated on the Alternative Investment Market to expand international operations and increase the investment in software development.

The company now have over 300 offices assisting 90,000 users worldwide with an annual turnover of over £100 million with the largest development team in the industry.

Clive Martell became chief executive from August 2009.

In February 2015, Pete Baxter, former vice president of sales and country manager for Autodesk in the UK, was appointed vice president.

Key Dates

1960s Initial research at Cambridge University

1970s Development taken over by Delta Group

1980s Software sales start

1989 Staff purchase company

1991 New HQ, Birmingham, UK

1997 Delcam floats on UK Market

2001 Alcami Joins Delcam

2005 EGS (FeatureCAM) joins Delcam

2006 IMCS (PartMaker) joins Delcam

2007 Crispin joins Delcam

2008 25,000th Customer

2009 30,000th Customer

2010 35,000th Customer

2012 40,000th Customer

2013 45,000th Customer

2014 Acquired by Autodesk

2015 50,000th Customer

2017 ArtCAM Announced End of development / End of support  The ArtCAM code was then licensed to the company Carvceo who re-branded the software and continue to develop and sell to previous ArtCAM customers 

2018 upon request to comm. dep.: Autodesk did not continue to develop and supporting the (Footwear) software; beside Powershape

Products

Advanced Manufacturing Solutions

PowerSHAPE 

Is a 3D CAD (Computer-aided Design) solution that runs on Microsoft Windows which allows for the design of 3D complex models using surfaces, solids and triangles. The software allows for the import of 3D point cloud data to reverse engineer 3D models.

PowerSHAPE is used for a variety of applications including Modelling for manufacture, electrode design, mould and toolmaking.

The code of PowerSHAPE originates from the DUCT software.

PowerMILL 
A CAM solution for the programming of tool paths for 2 to 5 axis CNC Milling (Computer Numerical Control).

PowerINSPECT

A CAD based inspection solution package for use with many types of inspection hardware,

including manual and CNC CMMs, portable arms, optical measuring devices and CNC machine tools (OMV). Developed for use on Microsoft Windows, the software is sold to a wide range of industries.

In 2004 Delcam won a Queen's award

for innovation for PowerINSPECT and by 2008 PowerINSPECT was Delcam's second biggest selling product.

PowerMILL Robot Interface 
A software package for the programming of machining robots with up to 8 axes.

FeatureCAM

A feature-based CAM solution for milling, turning, and wire EDM.

PartMaker
A CAM software for programming of turn-mill equipment bar-fed mills and Swiss-type lathes.

Delcam for SolidWorks 
A CAM solution based on PowerMILL and FeatureCAM embedded into SolidWorks.

Delcam Exchange 
A CAD data translator for reading and writing all commonly used CAD format files.

Delcam Electrode 
An integrated software within PowerSHAPE for automatic generation of solid electrode models for EDM with optional tool path generation in PowerMILL.

Metrology Solutions

On-Machine Verification
A package for measurement of complex parts directly on the machine tools.

Artistic CADCAM Solutions
ArtCAM JewelSmith 
A specialist 3D design and manufacture solution for jewelers.

ArtCAM Pro 
A complete solution for the design and manufacture of 2D Artwork & 3D Reliefs.

ArtCAM Insignia 
Is for production-level layout and manufacture of 2D Artwork & 3D Reliefs.

ArtCAM Express 
Is a low cost introductory design and machining solution.

After acquisition by Autodesk in 2014, Artcam brand was discontinued However the software is still in existence and licensed under another name - 'Carveco'

Footwear Solutions

OrderManager 
Is a web-based workflow management tool for tracking orders remotely.

OrthoMODEL 
Is a software package for the design of custom orthotic insoles.

OrthoMILL 
Is a software package for the manufacture of custom orthotic insoles.

iQube Scanner 
Is a foot, plaster cast and foambox scanner

LastMaker 
Is a software package for 3D last modification and 3D last grading.

ShoeMaker 
Is a software package for the 3D design of footwear.

SoleEngineer
Is software for 3D sole unit engineering and grading.

Engineer Pro 
Is software for 2D pattern engineering and grading.

PatternCut
Is software for 2D pattern part nesting and cutting.

KnifeCut
Is software for 2D pattern part nesting and cutting for projection cutting machines.

ShoeCost
Is software for total footwear costing.

TechPac
Is a technical documentation software package

Awards
1991 Queen's Award for International Trade

2003 Queen's Award for Innovation awarded for ArtCAM

2004 Queen's Award for Innovation awarded for PowerINSPECT

2005 Queen's Award for International Trade

2010 Queen's Award for Innovation awarded for Dental CADCAM Software
2011 Queen's Award for International Trade
2011 Ringier Technology Innovation Award for 'Delcam for SolidWorks' from International Metalworking News
2012 MTA Manufacturing Industry Award for Best Supplier Partnership for its relationship with Coventry Engineering Group
2014 MWP Awards 2014 – Best CADCAM or Control System
2014 Asian Manufacturing Awards 2014 - Best CAM Systems Provider

Graduate Programme
Delcam operates a development scheme for engineering and software graduates.  The graduate programme consists of five 10-week rotations across different functions of the company. Functions include Professional Services, international support, marketing, ArtCAM, PowerINSPECT, and training.  Graduates also have the opportunity to work at Delcam USA in Philadelphia or Salt Lake City.

Boris
Delcam's logo incorporates a computer-modelled spider named Boris.  This was produced as an experiment to render hairs in Delcam's CAD software in 1984.  Upon seeing a machined version at a show, the Managing Director Hugh Humphreys decided to take it home and use it within the company's logo.

References

External links
Official Delcam Site

Computer-aided manufacturing software
Computer-aided design software
Companies based in Birmingham, West Midlands